Alfred Charles Eustace Jarvis  (14 November 1876 – 26 March 1957) was an eminent Anglican priest in the 20th century.

Early life, family and education
He was born in Bournemouth in 1876. His parentage is unclear. In 1915, in Gallipoli, he told the Bishop of Fukien that he was the son of Dr. Birdwood, brother of Lt-General Birdwood, GOC Australian and NZ Army Corps, and that Dr. Birdwood’s second wife has refused to accept him, so he had been adopted. He began work as an apprentice in a furniture store and served as a soldier in the Boer War. He studied at Handsworth Theological College

Career
Jarvis was a Methodist minister from 1901 to 1908 when he was ordained into the Church of England. He was initially a Curate at All Saints, South Lambeth.

In 1909, he joined the Army Chaplain’s Department. His promotion in the Great War was rapid. In 1915, he was Principal Chaplain Mediterranean Expeditionary Force and from 1917 to 1919 Principal Chaplain Mesopotamia. In these four years, he won the Military Cross, was 3 times Mentioned in Despatches, was awarded the Serbian Order of the White Eagle and became a CMG He had served in Gallipoli, Salonika and Egypt as well as in the campaign leading to the capture of Baghdad. One of Jarvis’s strengths was his administrative ability. In Egypt and in Mesopotamia he had prepared Reports reorganising the Chaplain its as new camps and outposts appeared. After the war he was Assistant Chaplain-General, Northern Command from 1920 to 1925 and Chaplain-General to the Forces until 1931; and also Chaplain of the Tower of London from 1927. He was Provost and Vicar of Sheffield from 1931 to 1948; and also Archdeacon of Sheffield for two spells (1931 to 1933, and 1934 to 1938) and Rural Dean for one (1939–1942).

He was an Honorary Chaplain to two Kings and a Chaplain of the Order of St John of Jerusalem.

Demise
Jarvis died on 26 March 1957. There is a memorial plaque in Sheffield Cathedral.

References

	

1876 births
Clergy from Bournemouth
20th-century English Anglican priests
Recipients of the Military Cross
Companions of the Order of St Michael and St George
Chaplains General to the Forces
Knights Commander of the Order of the Bath
Honorary Chaplains to the Queen
Archdeacons of Sheffield
Provosts and Deans of Sheffield
Holders of a Lambeth degree
1957 deaths
World War I chaplains
British Army personnel of World War I
Military personnel from Hampshire